Fukushima 50 is a 2020 Japanese disaster drama film directed by Setsurō Wakamatsu and written by Yōichi Maekawa. Starring Koichi Sato and Ken Watanabe, it is about the titular group of employees tasked with handling the meltdown of the Fukushima Daiichi Nuclear Power Plant after the 2011 Tōhoku earthquake and tsunami. The film is based on the book by Ryusho Kadota, titled On the Brink: The Inside Story of Fukushima Daiichi, and it is the first Japanese film to depict the disaster.

Synopsis
At 2:46 p.m. on March 11, 2011, the largest earthquake in Japan's recorded history with a magnitude of 9.1 and a maximum seismic intensity of 7 occurred. A huge tsunami struck the Fukushima Daiichi Nuclear Power Plant. It was clear that a nuclear reactor lost all power due to flooding by the tsunami. A station blackout (SBO) caused the reactor to fall into an uncoolable situation and suffer unimaginable damage due to nuclear meltdown.

On-site workers, including Izaki Haruka, who is on duty at Units 1 and 2, remain in the nuclear power plant and work hard to control the reactor. Director Masao Yoshida, who oversees the overall command, inspires his subordinates, but also expresses anger at the head office and the Kantei (Prime Minister's Office), which are not fully aware of the situation. However, the efforts at the site were in vain and the situation continued to worsen, forcing the surrounding people to evacuate.

In the worst scenario of this accident estimated by the Kantei, the damage range would have a 250 km radius with the evacuation target population of circa 50 million people, which meant the destruction of eastern Honshu (largest main island). The only option left on the scene is "venting", which has never been done before in the world and requires manual labor by a worker to rush into the reactor with their body. The operation finally began while it was cut off from the outside world and no information entered.

Cast
Koichi Sato as Toshio Isaki, the shift supervisor of the power plant
Ken Watanabe as Masao Yoshida, the site superintendent of the Fukushima Daiichi Nuclear Power Plant during the disaster
Riho Yoshioka as Izaki Haruka
Hidetaka Yoshioka as Maeda Takumi
Narumi Yasuda as Asano Mari
Shirō Sano as the Prime Minister of Japan Naoto Kan
Mitsuru Hirata as Hirayama Shigeru
 Yuri Nakamura as Maeda Kana
Shigeru Izumiya as Matsunaga
Shōhei Hino as Omori Hisao
Naoto Ogata as Nojiri Shōichi

Production
Filming began in November 2018. Post-production began in May 2019.

Reception
Mark Schilling of The Japan Times gave the film a positive review, stating it "strives, boldly for a mainstream film, to tell certain home truths, from the profits-first mindset of the plant's operators."

References

External links
 
 地上波初放送　映画『Fukushima50』の事実歪曲とミスリード 門田隆将の原作よりひどい事故責任スリカエ、東電批判の甘さの理由（Japanese）

2020 films
Films about nuclear accidents and incidents
Films about the 2011 Tōhoku earthquake and tsunami
Films directed by Setsurō Wakamatsu
Films scored by Taro Iwashiro
Films set in 2011
Films set in Fukushima Prefecture
Films about the Fukushima Daiichi nuclear disaster
Japanese disaster films
2020s Japanese-language films
Kadokawa Daiei Studio films